Time Control is a studio album by Hiromi Uehara’s group, Hiromi’s Sonicbloom. It’s a concept album centered on the idea of time. In addition to Hiromi’s original trio, the album features guitarist David "Fuze" Fiuczynski whose technique and tonal approach gives the album its characteristic sound.

References 
C. Mishael Blayly of All About Jazz wrote "On Time Control, the pianist largely restricts herself to the acoustic piano, giving the recording a firmly grounded tradition while her approach to the 88, coupled with Fiuczynski's guitar playing, hurl the music into hyperspace. The pianist's classical training is readily evident... Her chordal modulation is breathtaking in its virtuosity."

Bill Meredith pf JazzTimes commented "Japanese keyboardist Hiromi Uehara’s 2003 CD, Another Mind, was the kind of stunning, unpredictable debut that left no room for anything but the sophomore slump of 2004’s comparatively predictable Brain. Last year’s Spiral inched closer to her stratospheric first impression, but Hiromi officially gets her groove back with Time Control, thanks in part to guest guitarist David “Fuze” Fiuczynski of the Screaming Headless Torsos."

Track listing
 Time Difference (6:19)
 Time Out (6:39)
 Time Travel (8:37)
 Deep into the Night (9:02)
 Real Clock vs. Body Clock = Jet Lag (5:53)
 Time and Space (7:55)
 Time Control, or Controlled by Time (8:29)
 Time Flies (8:01)
 Time's Up (0:47)
 Note From The Past (Japanese Edition Bonus Track) (12:08)

Personnel
 Hiromi Uehara - Keyboards
 Martin Valihora - Drums
 Tony Grey - Bass
 David Fiuczynski - Guitar

References

External links
Official website

2007 albums
Hiromi Uehara albums